Golbahar-e Atabaki (also Romanized as Golbahār-e Atābakī, Gol Bahār Atābakī, and Golbahār-e Atābak) is a village in Borborud-e Gharbi Rural District, in the Central District of Aligudarz County, Lorestan Province, Iran. At the 2006 census, its population was 142, in 25 families.

References 

Towns and villages in Aligudarz County